Ollantaytambo District is one of seven districts of the province Urubamba in Peru.

Geography 
The Urupampa and Willkapampa mountain ranges traverse the district. Other mountains are listed below:

Ethnic groups 
The people in the district are mainly indigenous citizens of Quechua descent. Quechua is the language which the majority of the population (58.55%) learnt to speak in childhood, 38.74% of the residents started speaking using the Spanish language (2007 Peru Census).

See also 
 Inkapintay
 Kachi Qhata
 Kusichaka River
 Pumamarka
 Qurimarka
 Qusqu Qhawarina
 Willkaraqay

References

External links
  Official municipal website